Paracles bogotensis is a moth of the subfamily Arctiinae first described by Paul Dognin in 1916. It is found in Colombia.

References

Moths described in 1916
Paracles